The Kolkata–Jaynagar Weekly Express is an Express train belonging to Eastern Railway zone that runs between  and  in India. It is currently being operated with 13135/13136 train numbers on a weekly basis.

Service

The 13135/Kolkata–Jaynagar Weekly Express has an average speed of 130 km/hr and covers 619 km in 14h 5m. 13136/Jaynagar–Kolkata Weekly Express has an average speed of 134 km/hr and covers 619 km in 15h 5m.

Route and halts 

The important halts of the train are:

Coach composition

The train has standard LHB rakes with max speed of 140 kmph. The train consists of 20 coaches:

 2 AC II Tier
 4 AC III Tier
 9 Sleeper coaches
 3 General
 2 Head-on Generation

Traction

Both trains are hauled by a Howrah Loco Shed-based WAP-7 or Asansol Loco Shed-based WAP-5 electric locomotive from Kolkata to till Jainagar and vice versa.

Rake sharing

The trains shares its rake with 22323/22324 Shabd Bhedi Superfast Express

 12319/12320 Kolkata–Agra Cantonment Superfast Express
 12357/12358 Durgiana Express

See also 

 Kolkata railway station
 Jaynagar railway station
 Ganga Sagar Express
 Howrah–Jaynagar Passenger

Notes

References

External links 

 13135/Kolkata–Jaynagar Weekly Express
 13136/Jaynagar–Kolkata Weekly Express

Transport in Kolkata
Transport in Jainagar
Express trains in India
Rail transport in West Bengal
Rail transport in Jharkhand
Rail transport in Bihar
Railway services introduced in 2012